Mount Chamah is located in the Titiwangsa Mountain Range in the northwest of Kelantan, Malaysia. It is the fifth highest mountain in the Malay Peninsula and is one of the peninsula's few mountains above . It is the second  highest point in the state of Kelantan.

During the period of the Communist Insurgency, this area was out of bounds for ordinary citizens. However, after the peace agreement between the Malaysian government and the communists that was signed in Hat Yai in the 1980s, the authorities began to relax their rules on jungle trekking in the Titiwangsa Range.

Mount Chamah is said to be one of the more difficult mountains to climb due to its limited access points. The place is rather untouched, and tigers still inhabit the mountain.

See also
 List of mountains in Malaysia

References

Chamah
Titiwangsa Mountains